The following table indicates the party of elected officials in the U.S. City of New York, New York since the modern five-borough city was created in 1898:
Mayor
President of the New York City Council/New York City Public Advocate (after 1993)
Comptroller

The table also indicates the historical party composition in the:
5 Borough Presidencies
New York City Council

References

Government of New York City
Political parties in New York (state)